Sport Club Santos Dumont, commonly known as Santos Dumont, was a Brazilian football club based in Salvador, Bahia state. They won the Campeonato Baiano once.

History
The club was founded on May 3, 1904, and named after the Brazilian pioneer of aviation, Alberto Santos-Dumont. They won the Campeonato Baiano in 1910. The club folded in 1913.

Achievements

 Campeonato Baiano:
 Winners (1): 1910

Stadium
Sport Club Santos Dumont played their home games at Estádio Campo da Pólvora. The stadium had a maximum capacity of 2,000 people.

References

Defunct football clubs in Bahia
Association football clubs established in 1904
Association football clubs disestablished in 1913
1904 establishments in Brazil
1913 disestablishments in Brazil
Things named after Alberto Santos-Dumont